The Tuvalu Games is a multi-sport event, much like the Pacific Games (although on a much smaller scale), with participation exclusively from islands around Tuvalu.

History
The Games began in 2008, hosted in the capital, Funafuti.

All 8 islands can participate and compete between each island in events such as track and field events, football, badminton and other games.

In 2011 the Tuvalu Games were held in Funafuti from 26th to 30 April. Nukufetau won the most medals.

Islands
 Funafuti
 Vaitupu
 Nukufetau
 Nukulaelae
 Nanumea
 Niutao
 Nanumanga
 Nui

Sports
 Association Football
 Athletics
 Badminton
 Canoeing
 Rugby Sevens
 Tennis
 Volleyball

Football at the Tuvalu Games

Football has been a regular event at the Tuvalu Games, and is a competition organized by the Tuvalu National Football Association. It is called also Tuvalu Cup.

History
	
The tournament began in the 2008 season and ran up to the 2017 edition. The first champions were FC Manu Laeva.

The 2013 champions were FC Tofaga; winning the final against Nauti 1–0, with Etimoni Timuani scoring the only goal.

Men's tournament

Results

Number of titles

Women's tournament

Results

Number of titles

Men's B teams tournament

Results

Number of titles: B teams

References

 
Multi-sport events in Oceania
Sports competitions in Tuvalu
Recurring sporting events established in 2008
2008 establishments in Tuvalu
National multi-sport events